Cora is an unincorporated community in southern Sullivan County, in the U.S. state of Missouri.

The community is on Missouri Route T approximately six miles south of Milan. East Locust Creek flows past the west side of the community. The Chicago, Burlington and Quincy Railroad passes through the community.

History
Cora was originally called McCullough, and under the latter name was platted in 1877. A post office called Cora was established in 1877, and remained in operation until 1957.

References

Unincorporated communities in Sullivan County, Missouri
Unincorporated communities in Missouri